Pierre Roy (born March 12, 1952) is a Canadian retired professional ice hockey player who played 316 games in the World Hockey Association. He played for the Quebec Nordiques, Cincinnati Stingers, and New England Whalers.

Career statistics

References 

1952 births
Atlanta Flames draft picks
Binghamton Dusters players
Canadian ice hockey defencemen
Cincinnati Stingers players
Living people
Maine Nordiques players
New England Whalers players
Nova Scotia Voyageurs players
Sportspeople from Thetford Mines
Quebec Nordiques (WHA) players
Quebec Remparts players
Springfield Indians players
Ice hockey people from Quebec